iSmash is a high-street technology repair service, specialising in fixing smartphones, tablets and computers.

History 
iSmash was founded by Irish entrepreneur, Julian Shovlin, in 2013 to provide a same-day service for common smartphone repairs. The idea originated from Shovlin's own negative experience having his phone repaired, and wanting a solution for fixing damaged technology. Whilst a Business and Economics student at Trinity College Dublin, Shovlin set up his first repair shop at age 19 and invested £15,000 of savings in the business. This was later followed by a further £900,000 investment of seed money by angel investors.

Stores 
The first iSmash-branded store opened on the King’s Road, London in 2013. Since then, iSmash has opened 29 high street, shopping centre and train station locations across the UK, including London, Manchester, Bristol, Leeds, Brighton and Sheffield. When the Trinity Leeds store was opened, it caused some confusion with an existing iPhone and iPad repair shop called iPatch (founded in 2008), who deal exclusively with Apple product repairs.

A nationwide 50-store expansion began in 2018 and as of May 2021, 31 stores are open in total. Currently the company has a 3/5 ratings review on careers website Glassdoor and 52% of responding employees would recommend working at iSmash to their friends and 81% approve of the CEO.

References

External links 
 

2013 establishments in England
Information technology companies of the United Kingdom